Ski jumping at the 2015 European Youth Olympic Winter Festival was held 27–30 January 2015 at Montafon Nordic Sportszentrum in Tschagguns, Austria. There are four events contested in this edition which consisted of 2 boys' events and an event both for girls and mixed team.

Medal summary

Medal table

References
Boys' individual results
Boys' team results
Girls' individual results
Mixed team results

European Youth Olympics
2015 European Youth Olympic Winter Festival
2015 European Youth Olympics
2015